Mischke Butler is an American singer, songwriter, vocal producer, vocal coach and vocal arranger, best known for his work with Michael Jackson, Spice Girls, Keke Palmer, and Little Mix. Butler, raised in Detroit, was discovered by producer Rodney Jerkins, who would mentor him for several years. Originally a member of Jerkins' "camp" of lyric and melody writers, he soon began to branch out into vocal arrangements and production. His contributions to El DeBarge's 2010 album Second Chance earned him a Grammy nomination for Best R&B Song.

Songwriting, production, background vocal and arrangement credits
Credits are courtesy of Discogs, Spotify, and AllMusic.

Vocal production and arrangement credits

Awards and nominations

References 

Living people
Year of birth missing (living people)